101 Park Avenue is a  tall skyscraper at 41st Street and Park Avenue in the Murray Hill neighborhood of Manhattan, New York.

Eli Attia Architects designed the tower. The building contains an impressive roster of tenants, as well as several attractions and amenities such as Convene, Five Iron Golf, and Museum of the Dog. 
The building has its own zip code, 10178. 
The digits were intentionally chosen to commemorate the building's address ("101") and the year construction began ("78"). It is one of only 41 buildings in Manhattan to hold this distinction .

In popular culture
It was used as the facade of the fictional "Pemrose building" in the 1987 film The Secret of My Success, as well as the fictional "Clamp Tower" in the 1990 film Gremlins 2: The New Batch. The building features in the 1991 Jeff Bridges film The Fisher King, and is shown as the site of George Costanza's office in a few ninth-season episodes of Seinfeld, as well as Dudley Moore's character's office in the film Crazy People. Person of Interest used the building several times including as IFT Headquarters in season one. It is also featured as a crash site in the 2012 film The Avengers.  It was used for a brief exit shot in the 2012 Richard Gere film Arbitrage.  Most recently it was featured as the office in the 2019 film Isn’t It Romantic. The buildings roof was used in the 1985 second season feature length opener of Miami Vice, where Crockett & Tubbs face a showdown with an NYPD hostile to their investigation into a powerful Colombian drug dealing syndicate operating in the city.

It is also on the roof of this skyscraper that the final shots of the clip made for the piece Looking up, by Michel Petrucciani, were shot. The 101 Park Avenue website has an ongoing list of its use in film and television.

Notable tenants 
 Convene
 Five Iron Golf
 Curtis, Mallet-Prevost, Colt & Mosle
 Fox Rothschild
 Wendel (group)
 Morgan, Lewis & Bockius
 Morgan Stanley
 CI Financial
 Federal Home Loan Banks
 Tata Consultancy Services (North American HQ)
 Tiger Management
 Federated Investors
 American Kennel Club
 Nippon Life
 HJ Kalikow & Co LLC

See also 
 List of tallest buildings in New York City

References

External links
 101 Park Ave.
 Emporis
 Skyscraperpage

Skyscraper office buildings in Manhattan
Office buildings completed in 1982
1982 establishments in New York City
Park Avenue
Murray Hill, Manhattan